Love You Forever is a 1986 children's picture book written by Robert Munsch and illustrated by Sheila McGraw. The story centers on a mother who sings a lullaby to her son at each stage of his life. During his childhood, she becomes frustrated with his rebellious nature, yet always sings to him after he falls asleep. The mother and son grow older, with the former becoming sick due to old age, and one day unable to sing the lullaby. The son sings the rest for her, and after her death, begins to sing the lullaby to his newborn daughter.

Story
The story details the cycle of life by chronicling the experiences of a young son and his mother throughout the course of the boy's life and describing the exasperating behavior exhibited by him throughout his youth. Despite her occasional aggravation caused by her son's behavior, the mother nonetheless visits his bedroom nightly to cradle him in her arms, and sing a brief lullaby promising to always love him. After her son enters adulthood and moves across town, his elderly mother occasionally sneaks into his bedroom at night to croon her customary lullaby. However, she gradually grows old and frail, and her grown son visits his feeble, sickly mother for the final time. When the son first arrives, his mother tries to sing her lullaby to him, but she is too weak to finish. The son then cradles his mother in his arms and sings an altered rendition of her lullaby in reciprocation for the unconditional love that she had shown him throughout his life, vowing to always love her in return. After returning home in a scene implying the death of his mother, the son cradles his newborn daughter and sings his mother's signature lullaby for her, implying that the cycle will continue.

Creation

The book was written after Munsch and his wife had two stillborn babies. They have since adopted three children.

Reception
Love You Forever was listed fourth on the 2001 Publishers Weekly All-Time Bestselling Children's Books list for paperbacks at 6,970,000 copies (not including the 1,049,000 hardcover copies). In 2001, Maria Shriver wrote in O, The Oprah Magazine: "I have yet to read this book through without crying. It says so much about the circle of life, youth, parenting, and our responsibility for our parents as we grow older. The message is so simple yet so profound. Love You Forever is a great gift for anyone with a child, or even for your own parents." Based on a 2007 online poll, the National Education Association listed the book as one of its "Teachers' Top 100 Books for Children."

Some readers dislike the portion of the story where the mother sneaks into her grown son's home. One Publishers Weekly reviewer states that Love You Forever is a divisive children's book. "Either it moves you to tears and you love it, or it makes your skin crawl and you detest it..." A commentator wrote "it's either a touching account of a mother's unending love or the ultimate helicopter parenting gone bad."

Media appearances
The book is prominently featured in the Friends episode "The One with the Cake". In the episode, Joey performs a dramatic reading of the book at Emma's first birthday, moving everyone to tears. Inspired by this, Joey later decides to recite the book as a dramatic monologue at an audition.

The book was read by Madeleine Stowe to Tori Barban in the movie The Christmas Hope, the third movie in The Christmas Shoes trilogy.

Playwright Topher Payne wrote an alternative ending to the story, in which the mother is forced to recognize the son's need for personal space, and they instead agree to share their time doing things together.

In the season eleven episode “Decision Time” of the tv series Heartland, Amy reads the book to her baby.

In the Manifest episode "All-Call," Eden is briefly shown reading the book.

References

External links
 Audio file of the book, read by the author

1986 children's books
Canadian children's books
Canadian picture books